Rajendra Shukla (born 3 August, 1964) is an Indian politician of the Bharatiya Janata Party and a Member of the Legislative Assembly from Rewa constituency of Madhya Pradesh. He is a former  Minister of Commerce, Industry and Employment in Government of Madhya Pradesh.

Personal
Sri. Rajendra Shukla an eminent politician Of Madhya Pradesh was born on 3 August 1964 in Rewa. His father Sri Bhaiyalal Shukla was a contractor and social worker. He studied at Government school and holds bachelor degree in Civil Engineering from Government Engineering College Rewa. With leadership qualities blooming in his young age only, he became the president of Government Engineering College Student Union in 1986.

Political career 
He was president of Government Engineering College Student Union in 1986.He made his way into politics by contesting in 1998 assembly election, which he lost to INC candidate Pushparaj Singh by a close margin of 1394 votes. He got elected to assembly for the first time in 2003, defeating incumbent Pushparaj Singh.
 
He repeated his victory again in 2008 and 2013 Madhya Pradesh assembly election. In his tenure as an MLA, he served under different ministries including forestry, biodiversity/biotechnology, mineral resources and law and legislative affairs. He also took charge as a cabinet minister in 2013 under Shivaraj Singh Chauhan Government.

In 2018 instead of anti-incumbency against him, he won against INC candidate Abhay Mishra by a margin of 18,089 votes.

Election 
In the Madhya Pradesh Legislative Assembly Election 2008 he defeated the Bahujan Samaj Party & Indian National Congress candidates Dr Mujib Khan and Rajendra Sharma, respectively.

Previously in the Madhya Pradesh Legislative Assembly Election 2003 he defeated sitting Indian National Congress MLA and Ex-Minister Pushpraj Singh, after losing the previous election to him in 1998.

References

External links

People from Madhya Pradesh
People from Rewa, Madhya Pradesh
Living people
Madhya Pradesh MLAs 2003–2008
Madhya Pradesh MLAs 2008–2013
Bharatiya Janata Party politicians from Madhya Pradesh
1964 births